This is a list of the Spanish Singles number-ones of 1968.

Chart history

See also
1968 in music
List of number-one hits (Spain)

References

1968
Spain Singles
Number-one singles